Davin Tong, better known by his alias Peter Chao (born 1987), is a Canadian actor, comedic vlogger, and YouTube personality known for his unconventional portrayals of Asian stereotypes, which alongside other politically incorrect videos have drawn mixed criticism from several sources. Born and raised in New Brunswick, Canada, Tong is the second son of "Chinese immigrants", while his character Chao was born and raised in Hong Kong. Tong is bilingual, speaking both fluent English and Cantonese.

Early life and education
Davin Tong was born and raised in New Brunswick, Canada, the second son of "Chinese immigrants". He produced an early version of Paper Trail, a minute-long short film pertaining to a neighbor caught stealing newspapers, with director Travis Grant. The film caught the Vancouver Film School's attention and it subsequently issued scholarships to them. Tong graduated in 2008.

Background

Personal life
Tong realised his flair for vlogging when one of his first YouTube uploads, about a Chinese restaurant run by Indians, garnered around 15,000 views. Under the username pyrobooby, Tong adopted the guise of "Chinese Guy", and later Peter Chao. Tong described the character as born and raised in Hong Kong, and "a zany Chinese immigrant forced into Canada by his prostitute mother. Instead of listening to his mother to go to school, he decided to pursue comedy on YouTube."

Tong's character Chao has drawn mixed reception, often being mistaken as a real person. As a result for posting racist content, the account had been previously suspended for a period of fourteen days after showing a video deemed to mock African-Americans. Gabriella Nomura of The Vancouver Sun has branded Chao as "a breath of politically incorrect fresh air", while Kevin Tang of Amped Asia has called him "racist, sexist, vulgar, and self-deprecating" but also "one of the most funny Youtube celebrities". However, viewership has been positive. The "Canton Style" music video – a parody of Korean singer-rapper Psy's "Gangnam Style" – amassed 1.1 million views within three days of its uploading. His videos are, as of 2011, the number one and two most watched in Canada. Tong has said, in response to audience comments that his performances are "racist", that everything is "done for comedy. I'm not really racist against anybody. I take stereotypes and I make them outlandish so everybody can laugh."

Creative Content
Chao is seen in almost every video as sporting a pair of sunglasses a habit which kindled viewer interest. Tong attributes the sunglasses as contributing to Chao's "cool factor". In the videos, Chao puts on a "thick, over-the-top Cantonese" and "fresh-off-the-boat" accent. Chao also parodies popular songs, such as the Justin Bieber hits "As Long as You Love Me" and "Boyfriend", as well as criticizing and poking fun at other people, usually with profane language. Fans of Chao are referred to as "Chao Nation". Beth Hong of The Vancouver Observer writes that Chao is an example of a "FOB" or a "Honger". Tong – speaking in character – refutes this, stating that "a FOB is a fresh-off-the-boat immigrant that come  all the way from China to study in North America. Don't look at me, I'm not a FOB. I'm Peter Chao. FOBs can't speak a lick of English."

Professional Wrestling
Chao has appeared frequently in Elite Canadian Championship Wrestling beginning July 6, 2013 in Port Coquitlam, B.C. where Colt Cabana taught him a few things about wrestling. He was a part of ECCW Ballroom Brawl at the Commodore Ballroom in January 2014, the largest attendance for independent wrestling in Vancouver in the last 25 years.

Discography

Music videos

Filmography

Commercials

Film

Theatre and Stage

References

External links
 Official YouTube channel
 Second Official YouTube channel
 
 
 Principals Talent Profile
 

1987 births
Living people
21st-century Canadian comedians
21st-century Canadian male actors
Canadian music video directors
Canadian male actors of Chinese descent
Canadian male comedians
Canadian male film actors
Canadian YouTubers
Comedians from New Brunswick
Comedians from Vancouver
Male actors from New Brunswick
Male actors from Vancouver
People from Fredericton